The following radio stations broadcast on FM frequency 90.7 MHz:

Argentina
 Asunción in Arroyo Seco, Santa Fe
 Cadena 3 Río Cuarto in Río Cuarto, Córdoba
 Ciudad in Berazategui, Buenos Aires
 Daireaux in Daireaux, Buenos Aires
 Estilo in Venado Tuerto, Santa Fe
 Fribuay in Ramos Mejía, Buenos Aires
 LRI939 Genesis in Coronel Pringles, Buenos Aires 
 GPS El Camino in Buenos Aires
 Impacto in Baradero, Buenos Aires
 Integración in Olavarría, Buenos Aires
 La Base in Santa Rosa, La Pampa
 Libertad in Villa Nueva, Córdoba
 LRI323 Líder in Bigand, Santa Fe
 LRM 967 Master in Diamante, Entre Ríos
 María Del Rosario in Piñeyro, Buenos Aires
 Mix in General Pico, La Pampa
 Municipal in Añelo, Neuquén
 Nativa in Posadas, Misiones
 Punto a Punto in Córdoba
 Radio María in Famatina, La Rioja
 Radio María in San Miguel de Tucumán, Tucumán
 Radio María in Las Heras, Santa Cruz
 Radio María in Chañar Ladeado, Santa Fe
 Radio María in Tunuyán, Mendoza
 Rosario Clásica in Rosario, Santa Fe
 Saladillo in Saladillo
 LRK 428 Satélite in San Pedro de Jujuy, Jujuy

Australia
 ABC Classic FM in Emerald, Queensland
 3REG in Sale, Victoria
 Crow FM in Wondai, Queensland
 SYN 90.7 in Melbourne, Victoria

Canada (Channel 214)
 CBFX-FM-2 in Sherbrooke, Quebec
 CBL-FM-2 in Paris, Ontario
 CBL-FM-3 in Orillia, Ontario
 CBN-FM-1 in Grand Falls-Windsor, Newfoundland and Labrador
 CBOF-FM in Ottawa, Ontario
 CBON-FM-24 in Kapuskasing, Ontario
 CBON-FM-27 in Wawa, Ontario
 CBPJ-FM-1 in Waterton Park, Alberta
 CBPS-FM in Bruce Peninsula Park, Ontario
 CBRN-FM in North Bend, British Columbia
 CBRX-FM-3 in Riviere-du-Loup, Quebec
 CFBO-FM in Moncton, New Brunswick
 CFMI-FM-1 in Whistler, British Columbia
 CHJJ-FM in Cobourg, Ontario
 CHLM-FM in Rouyn, Quebec
 CHQI-FM in Niagara on the Lake, Ontario
 CJPP-FM in Point Pelee National Park, Ontario
 VF2457 in Passmore, British Columbia
 VF7130 in Oakville, Ontario
 VF8015 in Shawinigan-Sud, Quebec

China 
 CNR Music Radio in Wuhan

Malaysia
 Ai FM in Kuching, Sarawak
 Era in Langkawi, Kedah and Satun, Thailand
 Red FM in Miri, Sarawak
 TraXX FM in Kota Kinabalu, Sabah

Mexico
 XHALAM-FM in Álamo-Temapache, Veracruz
 XHCCCC-FM in Culiacán, Sinaloa
 XHCRIS-FM in San Cristóbal de las Casas, Chiapas
 XHEZ-FM in Caborca, Sonora
 XHFL-FM in Guanajuato, Guanajuato
 XHHLL-FM in Hermosillo, Sonora
 XHHTS-FM in Tapachula, Chiapas
 XHJRZ-FM in Jerez, Zacatecas
 XHLDC-FM in Magdalena de Kino, Sonora
 XHMOE-FM in Mexicali, Baja California
 XHOY-FM in Guadalajara, Jalisco
 XHPSTZ-FM in Sombrerete, Zacatecas
 XHSIBS-FM in Huecorio, Michoacán
 XHQO-FM in Cosamaloapan, Veracruz
 XHQOO-FM in Cancún, Quintana Roo
 XHRTP-FM in San Martín Texmelucan-Puebla, Puebla
 XHTCP-FM in Tehuacán, Puebla
 XHTIM-FM in Tijuana, Baja California

Philippines
  in Metro Manila
DYAC in Cebu City
DXBM in Davao City
DWII-FM in Legazpi City
DWIL in Laoag

Russia
  in Perm
 Lipetsk FM in Lipetsk

United States (Channel 214)
  in Fort Totten, North Dakota
 KALX in Berkeley, California
  in Baker, Oregon
 KAVW in Amarillo, Texas
 KAYE-FM in Tonkawa, Oklahoma
 KBOO in Portland, Oregon
  in Brainerd, Minnesota
  in Mccall, Idaho
  in Twin Falls, Idaho
 KCKD in Garapan, Northern Marianas Islands
 KCSE (FM) in Lamar, Colorado
 KEKL in Emporia, Kansas
 KENC in Estes Park, Colorado
 KEZB in Beaver, Utah
  in Grand Forks, North Dakota
  in Fresno, California
 KFXT in Sulphur, Oklahoma
 KGBV in Hardin, Texas
 KGFA (FM) in Great Falls, Montana
 KGHW in Onida, South Dakota
  in Longmont, Colorado
 KHOO in Hoonah, Alaska
  in Hollister, California
  in Lawrence, Kansas
 KJKT in Spearfish, South Dakota
 KJND-FM in Williston, North Dakota
  in Woodward, Oklahoma
 KJZK in Kingman, Arizona
  in Wailuku, Hawaii
 KLFH in Fort Smith, Arkansas
  in Marvell, Arkansas
 KLMQ in Placerville, Colorado
 KLRM in Melbourne, Arkansas
  in Alexandria, Louisiana
 KLSE (FM) in Rochester, Minnesota
 KLZL-LP in Ten Sleep, Wyoming
 KMBM in Polson, Montana
 KMBV in Valentine, Nebraska
 KMPB in Frisco, Colorado
  in Brookings, Oregon
  in Show Low, Arizona
  in Grand Island, Nebraska
 KNKT in Cannon AFB, New Mexico
 KNSC in Carroll, Iowa
 KNVQ in Spring Creek, Nevada
 KNWR in Ellensburg, Washington
  in Joplin, Missouri
 KODK in Kodiak, Alaska
 KOHH in San Lucy, Arizona
  in Okoboji, Iowa
 KOUI in Louisville, Mississippi
 KPEF in White Castle, Louisiana
  in Los Angeles, California
 KPWY in West Yellowstone, Montana
 KQBM in San Andreas, California
 KQFR in Moyle Springs, Idaho
 KQLC in Sealy, Texas
 KQLV (FM) in Santa Fe, New Mexico
 KQQJ in Juneau, Alaska
 KQSH in Dodge City, Kansas
 KRDP in Apache Junction, Arizona
 KRWG (FM) in Las Cruces, New Mexico
 KRZU in Batesville, Texas
  in Brookings, South Dakota
  in Everett, Washington
 KSLS in Dickinson, North Dakota
 KSQD in Santa Cruz, California
 KSRI in Sterling, Colorado
 KTAA in Big Sandy, Texas
  in Trinidad, Colorado
  in Rudolph, Texas
 KTTK (FM) in Lebanon, Missouri
 KUWV in Lingle, Wyoming
  in Omaha, Nebraska
  in Victoria, Texas
 KVSR in Kirksville, Missouri
 KWLJ-LP in Moorhead, Minnesota
 KWMU in Saint Louis, Missouri
 KXCR in Florence, Oregon
 KYKL in Tracy, California
 KYPR in Miles City, Montana
 KYWA in Wichita, Kansas
 KZNP in Mullan, Idaho
  in Pullman, Washington
  in Philo, California
  in Augusta, Georgia
  in Hohenwald, Tennessee
  in Berrien Springs, Michigan
  in Brunswick, Georgia
 WAZU in Peoria, Illinois
 WBEQ in Morris, Illinois
 WBHL in Harrison, Michigan
  in Wilkes-Barre, Pennsylvania
  in Williamsport, Pennsylvania
  in Bowling Green, Kentucky
 WDWC in Martins Ferry, Ohio
 WEGB in Napeague, New York
  in Emory, Virginia
  in Keene, New Hampshire
  in Charlotte, North Carolina
  in Fort Gay, West Virginia
 WFLV in West Palm Beach, Florida
  in Thomasville, Georgia
  in New York, New York
  in Lima, Ohio
 WGRW in Anniston, Alabama
 WGSN in Newport, Tennessee
 WGXC in Acra, New York
 WHAD in Delafield, Wisconsin
  in Johnson, Vermont
  in Panama City, Florida
  in West Barnstable, Massachusetts
 WKPS in State College, Pennsylvania
  in Knightstown, Indiana
  in Struthers, Ohio
 WLGU in Lancaster, New York
  in Glens Falls, New York
  in Ripley, West Virginia
  in Manchester, New Hampshire
  in New Concord, Ohio
  in Orlando, Florida
  in Harrisonburg, Virginia
  in Goodman, Wisconsin
  in Griffin, Georgia
  in Durham, North Carolina
  in Sandusky, Michigan
  in Traverse City, Michigan
 WNPH in Portsmouth, Rhode Island
  in Norwalk, Ohio
  in Morehead City, North Carolina
 WPAI in Nanty Glo, Pennsylvania
  in Pattersonville, New York
  in Utica, New York
 WPSR (FM) in Evansville, Indiana
  in Paris, Kentucky
  in Lafayette, Indiana
 WRTE in Chicago, Illinois
  in Ephrata, Pennsylvania
 WSDL (FM) in Ocean City, Maryland
 WSKX in Christiansted, United States Virgin Islands
  in Springfield, Massachusetts
  in Grand Marais, Minnesota
  in Blacksburg, Virginia
 WUWG in Carrollton, Georgia
  in Montgomery, Alabama
  in Galesburg, Illinois
  in Mansfield, Ohio
  in Grantham, Pennsylvania
 WVSS in Menomonie, Wisconsin
 WVTC in Randolph Center, Vermont
  in Tuscaloosa, Alabama
 WWOZ in New Orleans, Louisiana
 WWQA in Albany, Georgia
 WYBJ in Newton Grove, North Carolina
  in North Charleston, South Carolina
  in Manahawkin, New Jersey
 WZIS-FM in Terre Haute, Indiana
 WZIV in Princeton, Illinois
  in Dyersburg, Tennessee
 WZLV in Cape Charles, Virginia
 WZXY in Spring Grove, Pennsylvania

References

Lists of radio stations by frequency